Cedega may refer to:

 a variety of grape used to make port wine
 Cedega (software) (formerly known as WineX) was TransGaming Technologies' proprietary fork of Wine

de:Cedega